Montanaso Lombardo is a comune (municipality) in the Province of Lodi in the Italian region Lombardy, located about  southeast of Milan and about  northeast of Lodi.

Montanaso Lombardo borders the following municipalities: Mulazzano, Boffalora d'Adda, Galgagnano, Tavazzano con Villavesco, Lodi.

Culture 
A celebration is held at The Church of St. George the Martyr on the third Sunday in October to honor the patron saint. The Church of the Assumption of the Blessed Virgin Mary is located in the town square.
. Our Lady of Arcagna Sanctuary is also located in Montanaso Lombardo.

References

Cities and towns in Lombardy